Filipp Ivanovich Golikov (July 30, 1900 – July 29, 1980) was a Soviet military commander. As chief of the GRU (Main Intelligence Directorate), he is best known for failing to take seriously the abundant intelligence about Nazi Germany's plans for an invasion of the Soviet Union in June 1941, either because he did not believe them or because Joseph Stalin did not want to hear them. He served in subsequent campaigns and was promoted to the rank of Marshal of the Soviet Union in 1961.

Early career
Golikov was born into a peasant family of Russian ethnicity in Borisova, in the Perm Governorate of the Russian Empire. His father served as a medical orderly with the garrison in Tobolsk. Father and son both joined the Russian Communist Party (b) in April 1918. A month later, Golikov enlisted in the Red Army as a volunteer. He was a political commissar through most of the Russian Civil War, and for 11 years afterwards. He graduated from the M. V. Frunze Military Academy in 1933. He was appointed commander of a regiment in 1931, and in 1938, during the Great Purge he was suddenly promoted to membership of the Military Counil of the Belorussian (Belarus) Military District. He was apparently sent there to supervise a purge of Red Army commanders in the district, including the future war hero Georgy Zhukov, who never forgave him. Later in 1938, he was abruptly removed, and in November 1938 was made commander of the Vinnitsa Army Group, and, in 1939, of the 6th Army. During the Soviet invasion of Poland in 1939, he was in charge of overrunning and occupying Lvov. and in 1940 he served in the Winter War against Finland.

Head of Military Intelligence 
In July 1940, Golikov was appointed head of Main Intelligence Directorate (GRU), despite having no previous experience of intelligence gathering. Stalin evidently knew that he was ill-qualified: during the 18th party conference the following February, he said of Golikov "as an intelligence agent, he is inexperienced, naive: an intelligence agent ought to be like the devil, believing no one, not even himself." Five of Golikov's predecessors had been or were about to be shot; his immediate predecessor, Ivan Proskurov had been held responsible for the fiasco of the Finnish War, though it is more likely that he was sacked for being too outspoken about the poor state of preparedness of the Soviet military. Golikov therefore had a powerful incentive to tell Stalin only what he wanted to hear, and Stalin refused to believe that Hitler would break the non-aggression pact they had negotiated in 1939. From early in 1941, Soviet intelligence was receiving multiple warnings from within Germany, and from the British and American officials of the risk of a German invasion. On 20 March, Golikov signed a widely distributed assessment of all the current intelligence, which began with the observation: "The majority of agent reports concerning the possibility of war with the USSR in the spring of 1941 come from Anglo-American sources, the goal of which at present is without a doubt to worsen relations between the USSR and Germany." As late as May, even though he knew and had told his superiors that the number of German divisions on the USSR border had been increased from 70 to 107, Golikov forecast that Germany's next military operations would be against the UK, in Gibraltar, North Africa and the Near East.

War record 
Despite his record, Golikov was retained as head of the GRU until October 1941. He led a mission to London on July 8–13, and to Washington on 26 July. In 1942, he commanded the Bryansk Front, then at the start of the battle of Stalingrad, he was appointed deputy commander under General Andrey Yeryomenko. When it was decided to move the command headquarters to comparative safety on the East bank of the Volga, Golikov was ordered to stay behind in the city. According to Nikita Khrushchev, the front's political commissar: "A look of terror came over Golikov's face...I never saw anyone, soldier or civilian, in such a state during the whole war. He was white as a sheet and begged me not to abandon him. He kept saying over and over, 'Stalingrad is doomed'.". He was recalled to Moscow, where he complained to Stalin about the way Khrushchev and Yeryomenko had treated him. Stalin accepted his version, and appointed him commander of the Voronezh Front in October 1942. He led the counterattack that recaptured Voronezh on 26 January 1943, and Kharkov on 16 February, but after Kharkov was retaken by the Germans, in March 1943, Marshal Zhukov insisted that Golikov be dismissed.

For the remainder of the war, until 1950, he was head of the Chief Personnel Directorate of the USSR Ministry of Defence. In October 1944, he was also appointed head of the council for the repatriation of Soviet prisoners of war.

Aleksandr Solzhenitsyn mentions Golikov briefly in a footnote in part one of his Gulag Archipelago, implicating him in the mass incarceration in the gulag system of former Soviet POWs who returned home after World War II. He writes, "One of the biggest war criminals, Colonel General Golikov, former chief of the Red Army's intelligence administration, was put in charge of coaxing the repatriates home and swallowing them up."

Later career 

After the war, Golikov held a succession of mainly political posts at the USSR Ministry of Defence. In 1946, Stalin began to resent the praise heaped on Marshal Zhukov as the architect of victory, so Golikov presented a detailed case against the Marshal at a special session of the Military Council, in June. Zhukov was publicly humiliated and relegated to a minor military post. In 1949–50, Golikov contributed to the Leningrad affair, the virulent purge of the Leningrad party leadership, by engineering the dismissal of the head of the Main Political Administration of the Armed Forces, Iosif Shikin. In 1950, he was given command of a mechanised army, and in 1956 was appointed head of the Military Academy of Armoured Troops. In January 1958, he benefited from the second fall of Marshal Zhukov, by being appointed head of the Main Political Administration of the Armed Forces, his job being to ensure that the military stayed under communist party control. He was abruptly dismissed in April 1962, officially for health reasons, though the real reason may be that he opposed Khrushchev's decision to ship nuclear missiles to Cuba. Afterwards, he was appointed Inspector General of the USSR Ministry of Defence.

Golikov died on July 29, 1980 in Moscow and was buried at Novodevichy Cemetery.

Awards and decorations
USSR

Foreign

Further reading
  McCauley, Martin. Who's Who in Russia since 1900 (Routledge 1997) p 94

References

External links
Biography of Marshal of Soviet Union Filipp Ivanovich Golikov

1900 births
1980 deaths
People from Kurgan Oblast
People from Kamyshlovsky Uyezd
Bolsheviks
Central Committee of the Communist Party of the Soviet Union members
First convocation members of the Soviet of the Union
Fourth convocation members of the Soviet of Nationalities
Fifth convocation members of the Soviet of Nationalities
Sixth convocation members of the Soviet of Nationalities
Members of the Central Committee of the Communist Party of Byelorussia
Marshals of the Soviet Union
GRU officers
Frunze Military Academy alumni
Soviet military personnel of the Russian Civil War
People of the Soviet invasion of Poland
Soviet military personnel of World War II
Recipients of the Order of the Cross of Grunwald, 1st class
Recipients of the Order of Kutuzov, 1st class
Recipients of the Order of Lenin
Recipients of the Order of the Red Banner
Recipients of the Order of the Red Banner of Labour
Recipients of the Order of the Red Star
Recipients of the Order of Suvorov, 1st class
Recipients of the Czechoslovak War Cross
Recipients of the Order "For Service to the Homeland in the Armed Forces of the USSR", 3rd class
Burials at Novodevichy Cemetery